Thomas Chalmers Fisher (November 1, 1880 – September 3, 1972) was a professional baseball pitcher. The 5"10½", . right-hander played one season in Major League Baseball for the Boston Beaneaters in 1904.

Fisher made his major league debut in relief on April 17, 1904 against the Brooklyn Superbas at Washington Park. His first major league win came as a starter on May 10 against the Chicago Cubs at West Side Park. The score was 7-1. He pitched his first shutout five days later at Robison Field, a 1–0 decision over the St. Louis Cardinals.

He ended his season and career with a 6–16 record for the 55-98 Beaneaters.  Other totals include 31 games pitched, 21 games started, 19 complete games, 2 shutouts, 9 games finished, and an earned run average of 4.25 in 214 innings pitched. He struck out 84 and walked 82. He also played six games in center field, and in a total of 39 games played had a batting average of .212 (21-for-99) with 2 home runs and 8 RBI.

Fisher died in his hometown of Anderson, Indiana, at the age of 91.

Trivia
Fisher's nickname was "Red."

External links

Retrosheet

Major League Baseball pitchers
Boston Beaneaters players
Youngstown Puddlers players
Wheeling Nailers (baseball) players
Toledo Mud Hens players
Bloomington Blues players
Shreveport Giants players
Shreveport Pirates (baseball) players
Mobile Sea Gulls players
Atlanta Crackers players
Minor league baseball managers
Baseball players from Indiana
Sportspeople from Anderson, Indiana
1880 births
1972 deaths